The Royal Australian Navy and Australian Army have operated 24 amphibious warfare ships. These ships have been used to transport Army units and supplies during exercises and operational deployments.

World War II and Cold War ships

These three ships had been built as civilian motor vessels and were converted to armed merchant cruisers at the outbreak of war in 1939. They were converted again to LSIs in 1943 and took part in United States and Australian amphibious assaults in the South West Pacific Area. The ships had a capacity of about 1,200 troops, which were landed from boats carried by the LSIs. Following the war, the three LSIs remained in service as transports until 1949 when they were returned to their owners.

The RAN borrowed six Landing Ships Tank (LSTs) from the Royal Navy between 1946 and 1955. The LSTs were used as general purpose vessels and did not specialise in amphibious operations.

After the LSTs were disposed of Australia was left without any amphibious warfare ships. To rectify this situation the Army purchased four  Landing Ships Medium (LSMs) from the United States Navy (USN) in 1959. These ships were operated by the 32nd Small Ship Squadron, Royal Australian Engineers and supported Army exercises and operations. All four of the ships saw active service during the Vietnam War where they carried supplies between Australia and South Vietnam and between South Vietnamese ports. All four ships were decommissioned in September 1971 when the 32nd Small Ship Squadron was disbanded.

Current ships

The LSMs were replaced by eight  which began to enter service in 1971. The first ship in the class,  was briefly operated by the Army's Water Transport force but was later transferred to the Navy and all subsequent ships in the class were transferred to the Navy while they were under construction. Three of the remaining craft have or will be decommissioned in December 2012, with the remainder to leave service during 2014. These ships have proven to be very successful and have supported Australian Army exercises and operations throughout South East Asia.

The Australian Defence Force's (ADF's) amphibious warfare capabilities were significantly expanded in 1982 when the landing ship heavy  was commissioned. This ship was the first amphibious vessel purpose built for the RAN and was based on the British  design. She has supported ADF operations around the world.

The ADF's amphibious warfare capabilities were further expanded in 1994 when two s were purchased from the USN. They have supported ADF operations in Afghanistan, Iraq, the Solomon Islands and East Timor.

In addition to the seagoing ships, the RAN and Army also currently operate a number of smaller amphibious craft which are carried by Tobruk and the Kanimbla-class ships. The RAN has four Landing Craft, Vehicle, Personnel (LCVP) which can carry a Land Rover sized vehicle or 36 personnel. The Army operates a small fleet of LCM-8 mechanised landing craft and LARC-V amphibious cargo vehicles.

Future ships
HMAS Tobruk and one of the LPAs were replaced by two s (LHDs) between 2012 and 2014. These ships are the largest warships ever operated by the Royal Australian Navy, and each is able to carry an infantry battalion and up to 24 Army and Navy helicopters. It is planned to replace the other LPA with a sealift ship. Both LPAs were taken out of service in September 2010 due to concerns about their seaworthiness. On 1 February 2011 the Minister for Defence announced that repairing Manoora would not be cost effective given that the ship was scheduled to retired at the end of 2012 and that she would instead be decommissioned. He also stated that Kanimbla would be repaired but was not expected to return to operational service until mid-2012. On 6 April 2011 Smith announced that Australia would buy Largs Bay and that the ship was expected to enter service with the RAN in 2012. In May 2011 the Australian Government chartered the civilian icebreaker  for two months to provide an amphibious capability while Tobruk was undergoing maintenance.

In December 2011 the government announced that it would purchase a commercial vessel to provide the RAN with a third ship for humanitarian and disaster relief tasks alongside Choules and Tobruk. A project is also underway to replace the LCHs and the Army and Navy's small amphibious craft. These new craft will be capable of operating from the well decks in the Canberra-class ships.

Notes

References